Lun  is a prolific Burmese writer and physician having written over 300 novels throughout her career.

Lun  was born on 8 June 1971 in Rangoon, Burma to parents Soe Thway and Mya Yi. Her birth name is  Lin. She matriculated from Basic Education High School No. 2 Dagon in 1987, earning distinctions in 4 subjects on the national matriculation exam. She pursued further studies at University of Medicine 1, Yangon, graduating with an MBBS degree in 1998. She is married to a British physician, Unt Tun Maung, and a daughter, May Maung. She currently resides in England.

Works
 (1990)
 (1991)
 (1991)
 (1991)
 (1991)
 (1992)
 (1992)
 (1992)
 (1993)
 (1993)
 (1993)
 (1993)
 (1993)

References

1971 births
People from Yangon
Living people
Burmese physicians
Burmese women physicians
University of Medicine 1, Yangon alumni
20th-century Burmese women writers
21st-century Burmese women writers
20th-century Burmese writers
21st-century Burmese writers
Burmese novelists